Bir Protik ( Bīr Pratīk, "Symbol of Bravery or Idol of Courage") is the fourth highest gallantry award in Bangladesh.

Recipients
This award was declared on 15 December 1973. A total of 426 people have received the award so far, all for their actions during the liberation war of Bangladesh in 1971.

Bangladesh Army

Bangladesh Air Force

Mukti Bahini (Freedom fighters)

Post Liberation War

Bangladesh Army

See also
Bir Bikrom
Bir Sreshtho
Bir Uttom

References

Military awards and decorations of Bangladesh
Awards established in 1973
1973 establishments in Bangladesh